This is a list of seasons completed by the Columbia Lions football team of the National Collegiate Athletic Association (NCAA) Division I Football Championship Subdivision (FCS). Since the team's 1870 creation, Columbia has played more than 1,100 football games, with an all-time record of 396–683–43. Columbia originally competed as a football independent before joining the Ivy League as a founding member in 1956.

Seasons

See also 
 List of Ivy League football standings

References 

Columbia Lions

Columbia Lions football seasons